George Frederick Elliott (1 May 1850 – 23 April 1913) was an English cricketer who played county cricket between 1874 and 1880.

Elliot was born at Farnham in Surrey in 1850, the son of George and Ellen Elliot (née Attfield). His father was a blacksmith and engineer who operated a business in Farnham. Elliot followed his father into the business and ran the family firm until his death as well as setting up another reengineering business in Farnham; at the 1911 census, shortly before his death, he described himself as a mechanical engineer. His father was also a cricketer and had played for teams around Farnham and for a Players of Surrey side at The Oval in 1849 in a non-first-class match.

During 1874 Elliott worked as an engine fitter and turner at the Royal Arsenal, Woolwich, then in Kent. He had played for Colts of Surrey sides in 1871 and 1872 and whilst at Woolwich played club cricket for the nearby New Cross Albion side. He had a reputation as an "enterprising batsman" and  made his first-class cricket debut for Kent County Cricket Club during 1874 in a match against Lancashire at Old Trafford. He played two matches for Kent during the season before playing for his native Surrey County Cricket Club between 1875 and 1880. He played 44 first-class matches for Surrey and made a total of 51 first-class appearances in his career, including playing for the South against the North in 1876. He played regularly for a variety of club sides and at least 12 times for the United South of England Eleven, including three times in first-class matches. He was described in his Wisden obituary as being "a sound batsman" and "a useful change bowler" who could bat patiently.

Elliott was married at least twice in his life. He was a well-known member of the Farnham volunteer fire brigade. He died at Farnham in 1913 aged 62.

References

External links

1850 births
1913 deaths
English cricketers
Kent cricketers
Surrey cricketers
United South of England Eleven cricketers
Players of the South cricketers
North v South cricketers